Saint-Vincent-des-Prés may refer to two communes in France:

Saint-Vincent-des-Prés, Saône-et-Loire, in the Saône-et-Loire  département 
Saint-Vincent-des-Prés, Sarthe, in the Sarthe  département